The Shire of Etheridge is a local government area in Far North Queensland, Australia in what is known as the Savannah Gulf region. Its economy is based on cattle grazing and mining.

History 

The Einasleigh Division was created on 11 November 1879 as one of 74 divisions around Queensland under the Divisional Boards Act 1879 with a population of 720. In 1891 it was reported that the divisional board had made no progress, perhaps because it covered a large area that was  sparsely settled.

With the passage of the Local Authorities Act 1902, Einasleigh Division became the Shire of Einasleigh on 31 March 1903.

On 15 March 1919, it was renamed Shire of Etheridge.

Towns and localities 
The Shire of Etheridge includes the following settlements:

 Georgetown
 Einasleigh
 Forsayth
 Gilbert River
 Mount Surprise
 Abingdon Downs
 Conjuboy
 Gilberton
 Lyndhurst
 Northhead
 Strathmore
 Talaroo

Former towns and localities

The Etheridge Shire had many mines in the late 1800s. This gave rise to a number of communities that no longer exist today:

 Cumberland
 Kidston

Amenities 
The Etheridge Shire Council operate a public library at Georgetown.

Population

Chairmen and mayors

 1888: C. Battersby
 1927: W. H. G. Gard
 2008–2012: Warren Devlin
 2012–2016: William Attwood
 2016–2020: Warren Devlin
2020–present: Barry Gilbert Hughes

References

External links
 University of Queensland: Queensland Places: Etheridge Shire

 
Etheridge
1879 establishments in Australia
North West Queensland